Cape Parry is a headland in Canada's Northwest Territories. Located at the northern tip of the Parry Peninsula, it projects into Amundsen Gulf. Cape Parry was formerly accessible through Cape Parry Airport that was located at the Distant Early Warning Line. The airport was listed as abandoned after the closure of the DEW line site.

It is named for the Arctic explorer William Edward Parry.

History
Between the 1950s to the 1980s, a Distant Early Warning Line site (PIN-Main) was located south of Police Point, the cape's western point. During the period of 1969 to 1982, eighteen sounding rocket launches were made at Cape Parry.

Geography
Cape Parry is a three-pointed outcrop of coastal cliffs. The deeply incised coastal beaches are composed of sand and gravel, and form bays and inlets. On either side of the narrow isthmus that joins Cape Parry to the Parry Peninsula are Tyne Bay to the west and Gillet Bay to the east.

Climate
Although the manned weather station is no longer in operation there is an automatic weather station (CZCP) at the site.

Flora and fauna
There is sparse vegetation, except in low-lying wet areas.

Beluga whale, bowhead whale, bearded seal, ringed seal, as well as caribou, grizzly bear, and polar bear, frequent the area.

There are nationally significant populations of common eider, glaucous gull, king eider, long-tailed duck, and yellow-billed loon on the cape. It is also one of only two sites in the western Arctic where black guillemot are thought to breed. The cape's thick-billed murre colony is more isolated than any other murre colony in the world.

Protection status
The cape, an Important Bird Area (NT041), is home to the Cape Parry Migratory Bird Sanctuary (Site 6) which was established in 1961. It is also an International Biological Programme Site (#4-11) and lies within a Key Marine Habitat Site (Site 19).

References

Peninsulas of the Northwest Territories
Important Bird Areas of the Northwest Territories
Rocket launch sites
Military history of Canada
Former populated places in the Inuvik Region
Geography of the Inuvialuit Settlement Region